Breitkreutz is a surname of German origin. Breitkreutz translates to broad cross. Notable people with the surname include:

Emil Breitkreutz (1883–1972), American middle-distance runner
Matthias Breitkreutz (born 1971), German footballer
Otto F. Breitkreutz (~1866–1928), known as Big Otto, American circus owner

See also
Patrick Breitkreuz, German footballer

German-language surnames